Adán Zapata Morales, or simply Adán Zapata (October 20, 1990 - June 1, 2012), was a Mexican singer within the genre of hip-hop/rap. He was born and lived in the colony Mexico Lindo in San Nicolás de los Garza, Nuevo Leon. From 2006 he belonged to the group called Mente En Blanco (MEB), where he was lead vocalist and the one that raised the group, until his murder in the colony "Los Morales" San Nicolás de los Garza, Nuevo Leon on June 1, 2012, at the age of 21, by an armed command of organized crime together with 3 other young members of the same group "Blank Mind" — two of them children of a former secretary of public security.

Death 
Adán Zapata was assassinated on June 1, 2012 at the age of 21, in the work of organized crime. He was in a van with 3 other members of the Blank Mind: Iván de Jesús Serna González, 25, known as DJ Esus, and brothers Diego Salvatore and Hector Daniel Almaraz Huerta, aged 20 and 19, respectively. The latter were children of the former Secretary of Public Security of the municipality of Guadalupe José Santos Almaraz.

Studio albums 
 2006 Anticuados
 2007 Zapata Producciones
 2010 Borrachos y Grifos
 2011 The North Side Kings
 2012 Soy de Barrio

See also
 List of murdered hip hop musicians

References 

Mexican male rappers
1990 births
2012 deaths
Singers from Monterrey
Mexican murder victims